The 2022 TCU Horned Frogs baseball team represents Texas Christian University during the 2022 NCAA Division I baseball season. The Horned Frogs play their home games at Lupton Stadium as a member of the Big 12 Conference. They are led by head coach Kirk Saarloos, in his inaugural year as head coach and tenth season at TCU.

Previous season
The 2021 TCU Horned Frogs baseball team notched a 41–20 (17–7) record. The Frogs claimed a share of the Big 12 regular season championship as well as the outright Big 12 Tournament championship. TCU received the #6 national seed in the 2021 NCAA Tournament and hosted the Fort Worth Regional. The Horned Frogs were eliminated from the Tournament by cross-metroplex rival Dallas Baptist. 

At the conclusion of the season, long-time TCU head coach Jim Schlossnagle departed the TCU baseball program and was replaced by 9-year assistant coach and former major league pitcher Kirk Saarloos. Saarloos retained Associate Head Coach Bill Mosiello, promoted John DiLaura from Volunteer Coach to Assistant Coach, retained student assistant coach and former TCU pitcher Matt Purke, and added former TCU-standout Kyle Winkler as the program's new Volunteer Assistant Coach. Winkler and Purke, both former All-American pitchers, were teammates on TCU's first-ever College World Series team in 2010.

Personnel

Coaching staff

Schedule and results

|-
! style="" | Regular Season (35–18)
|- valign="top" 

|- bgcolor="#bbffbb"
| Feb 18 || 6:00 pm || MLB Network || vs. * || No. 17 || Salt River FieldsScottsdale, AZ || W5–3 || Perez(1–0) || Brodell(0–1) || Ridings(1) || — || 1–0 || — || StatsStory
|- bgcolor="#ffbbbb"
| Feb 19 || 2:00 pm || — || vs. California* || No. 17 || Salt River FieldsScottsdale, AZ || L6–7 || Reinertsen(2–0) || Thomas(0–1) || — || — || 1–1 || — || StatsStory
|- bgcolor="#bbffbb"
| Feb 20 || 11:00 am || — || vs. * || No. 17 || Salt River FieldsScottsdale, AZ || W10–0(8) || Walker(1–0) || Wright(0–1) || — || — || 2–1 || — || StatsStory
|- bgcolor="bbffbb"
| Feb 22 || 6:00 pm || ESPN+ || * || No. 17 || Lupton StadiumFort Worth, TX || W11–1 || Brown(1–0) || Dewberry(0–1) || — || 3,731 || 3–1 || — || StatsStory
|- bgcolor="bbffbb"
| Feb 25 || 6:00 pm || FloSports || vs. Nebraska* || No. 17 || Globe Life FieldArlington, TX || W4–1 || Krob(1–0) || Perry(0–1) || Ridings(2) || 4,912 || 4–1 || — || StatsStory
|- bgcolor="bbffbb"
| Feb 26 || 2:00 pm || FloSports || vs. Nebraska* || No. 17 || Globe Life FieldArlington, TX || W8–3 || Cornelio(1–0) || Schanaman(0–2) || Bolden(1) || 5,476 || 5–1 || — || StatsStory 
|- bgcolor="bbffbb"
| Feb 27 || 1:00 pm || FloSports || vs. Nebraska* || No. 17 || Globe Life FieldArlington, TX || W5–3 || Walker(2–0) || McCarville(0–1) || Ridings(3) || — || 6–1 || — || StatsStory 
|-

|- bgcolor="bbffbb"
| Mar 1 || 6:00 pm || — || UT Arlington* || No. 16 || Lupton StadiumFort Worth, TX || W8–5 || Brown(2–0)  || Brooks(0–1)  || Ridings(4)  || 3,434 || 7–1 || — || StatsStory 
|- bgcolor="#ffbbbb"
| Mar 4 || 3:00 pm || SECN+  || at Kentucky* || #16 || Kentucky Proud ParkLexington, KY || L11–13 || Harney(2–0) || Perez(1–1) || — || 1,776 || 7–2 || — || StatsStory 
|- bgcolor="#ffbbbb"
| Mar 5 || 12:00 pm || SECN+ || at Kentucky* || No. 16  || Kentucky Proud ParkLexington, KY || L1–5 || Bosma(2–0) || Cornelio(1–1) || — || — || 7–3  || — || StatsStory 
|- bgcolor="bbffbb"
| Mar 5 || 5:00 pm || SECN+ || at Kentucky* || No. 16  || Kentucky Proud ParkLexington, KY || W12–8 || Ridings(1–0) || Harper(0–1)  || — || 2,270 || 8–3 || — || StatsStory 
|- bgcolor="#ffbbbb"
| Mar 8 || 11:00 am || ACCN+ || at * || No. 21  || Jim Patterson StadiumLouisville, KY || L8–9 || Poland(1–1) || Brown(2–1) || Prosecky(3) || 503 || 8–4 || — || StatsStory 
|- bgcolor="bbffbb"
| Mar 12 || 1:00 pm || ESPN+ || * || No. 21  || Lupton StadiumFort Worth, TX || W6–4  || Feser(1–0) || Early(1–1) || — || — || 9–4 || — || StatsStory
|- bgcolor="bbffbb"
| Mar 12 || 5:00 pm || ESPN+  || Army* || No. 21 || Lupton StadiumFort Worth, TX || W6–5(10)  || Ridings(2–0) || Lepicio(0–1) || — || 3,997 || 10–4 || — || StatsStory
|- bgcolor="bbffbb"
| Mar 13 || 1:00 pm || ESPN+ || Army* || No. 21 || Lupton StadiumFort Worth, TX || W5–2 || Krob(2–0) || Ruggieri(0–3) || Perez(1)  || 4,005 || 11–4  || —  || StatsStory
|- bgcolor="bbffbb"
| Mar 15 || 6:00 pm || ESPN+ || Texas A&M–CC* || No. 21 || Lupton StadiumFort Worth, TX || W17–6(8) || Bolden(1–0) || Westbrook(1–1) || — || 3,561 || 12–4 || — || StatsStory
|- bgcolor="bbffbb"
| Mar 18 || 6:30 pm || ESPN+ || at  || No. 21 || Baylor BallparkWaco, TX || W3–0 || Cornelio(2–1) || Thomas(3–2) || Ridings(5) || 2,309 || 13–4 || 1–0 || StatsStory
|- bgcolor="bbffbb"
| Mar 19 || 3:00 pm || ESPN+ || at Baylor || No. 21 || Baylor BallparkWaco, TX || W11–9(11) || Savage(1–0) || Voelker(1–3) || Ridings(6) || 3,066 || 14–4  || 2–0 || StatsStory
|- bgcolor="#ffbbbb"
| Mar 20 || 1:00 pm || ESPN+ || at Baylor || No. 21 || Baylor BallparkWaco, TX || L3–7 || Rigney(1–0) || Brown(2–2)  || Oliver(1) || 2,011 || 14–5 || 2–1 || StatsStory
|- bgcolor="bbffbb"
| Mar 22 || 6:00 pm || ESPN+ || at * || No. 19 || Crutcher Scott FieldAbilene, TX || W14–3(7) || Parker(1–0) || Bauman(0–2) || — || — || 15–5 || — || StatsStory
|- bgcolor="bbffbb"
| Mar 25 || 6:00 pm || ESPN+ ||  || No. 19 || Lupton StadiumFort Worth, TX || W7–5 || Cornelio(3–1) || Adams(2–2) || Ridings(7) || 4,743 || 16–5 || 3–1 || StatsStory
|- bgcolor="bbffbb"
| Mar 26 || 2:00 pm || ESPN+ || Kansas State || No. 19 || Lupton StadiumFort Worth, TX || W14–5 || Vail(1–0) || Jurecka(1–1) || — || 3,804 || 17–5 || 4–1 || StatsStory
|- bgcolor="bbffbb"
| Mar 27 || 1:00 pm || ESPN+ || Kansas State || No. 19 || Lupton StadiumFort Worth, TX || W11–3 || Walker(3–0) || Hassall(3–3) || — || 4,047 || 18–5 || 5–1 || StatsStory
|- bgcolor="#ffbbbb"
| Mar 29 || 6:00 pm || ESPN+ || Abilene Christian* || No. 12 || Lupton StadiumFort Worth, TX || L2–6 || Carlton(1–0) || Parker(1–1) || — || 3,651 || 18–6 || — || StatsStory
|- bgcolor="#ffbbbb"
| Mar 30 || 6:00 pm || ESPN+ || UTSA* || No. 12 || Lupton StadiumFort Worth, TX || L8–12 || Ward(1–0) || Oliver(0–1) || — || 3,301 || 18–7 || — || StatsStory
|-

|- bgcolor="#ffbbbb"
| April 1 || 6:00 pm || ESPN+ || West Virginia || No. 12 || Lupton StadiumFort Worth, TX || L2–3 || Braithwaite(1–0) || Ridings(2–1) || Short(1) || 3,902 || 18–8 || 5–2 || StatsStory
|- bgcolor="bbffbb"
| April 2 || 2:00 pm || ESPN+ || West Virginia || No. 12 || Lupton StadiumFort Worth, TX || W5–4 || Perez(2–1) || Hampton(4–2) || Ridings(8) || 4,668 || 19–8  || 6–2 || StatsStory
|- bgcolor="#ffbbbb"
| April 3 || 12:00 pm || ESPN+ || West Virginia || No. 12 || Lupton StadiumFort Worth, TX || L2–5 || Bravo(3–0) || Walker(3–1) || Braithwaite(2) || 4,013 || 19–9 || 6–3 || StatsStory
|- bgcolor="bbffbb"
| April 5 || 6:30 pm || ESPN+ || at UT Arlington* || No. 23 || Clay Gould BallparkArlington, TX || W10–2 || Bolden(2–0) || Novis(0–1) || — || 730 || 20–9 || — || StatsStory
|- bgcolor="#ffbbbb"
| April 8 || 6:30 pm || LHN || at No. 7 Texas || No. 23 || UFCU Disch–Falk FieldAustin, TX || L0–2 || Hansen(6–0) || Cornelio(3–2) || — || 7,482 || 20–10 || 6–4 || StatsStory
|- bgcolor="bbffbb"
| April 9 || 5:00 pm || ESPNU || at No. 7 Texas || No. 23 || UFCU Disch–Falk FieldAustin, TX || W7–5 || Bolden(3–0) || Stevens(4–3) || Ridings(9) || 7,323 || 21–10 || 7–4 || StatsStory
|- bgcolor="#ffbbbb"
| April 10 || 12:00 pm || ESPNU || at No. 7 Texas || No. 23 || UFCU Disch–Falk FieldAustin, TX || L3–7 || Sthele(3–0) || Walker(3–2) || — || 7,106 || 21–11 || 7–5 || StatsStory
|- bgcolor="#ffbbbb"
| April 12 || 6:30 pm ||  Bally Sports Southwest  || at No. 16 * ||  || Horner BallparkDallas, TX || L1–6 || Heaton(3–1) || Parker(1–2) || — || 1,561 || 21–12 || — || StatsStory
|- bgcolor="bbffbb"
| April 14 || 6:00 pm || ESPN+ || No. 4 Texas Tech ||  || Lupton StadiumFort Worth, TX || W7–4 || Mihlbauer(1–0) || Clark(0–1) || Savage(1) || 5,475 || 22–12 || 8–5 || StatsStory
|- bgcolor="bbffbb"
| April 15 || 6:00 pm || ESPN+ || No. 4 Texas Tech ||  || Lupton StadiumFort Worth, TX || W4–3 || Perez(3–1) || Birdsell(5–2) || Ridings(10) || 6,280 || 23–12 || 9–5 || StatsStory
|- bgcolor="bbffbb"
| April 16 || 2:00 pm || ESPN+ || No. 4 Texas Tech ||  || Lupton StadiumFort Worth, TX || W11–3 || Walker(4–2) || Hampton(3–3) || — || 5,706 || 24–12 || 10–5 || StatsStory
|- bgcolor="bbffbb"
| April 19 || 6:00 pm || ESPN+ || UT Arlington* || No. 21 || Lupton StadiumFort Worth, TX || W15–1(7) || Parker(2–2) || Hagan(1–3) || — || 3,533 || 25–12 || — || StatsStory
|- bgcolor="#ffbbbb"
| April 22 || 6:00 pm || ESPN+ || at No. 3 Oklahoma State || No. 21 || O'Brate StadiumStillwater, OK || L2–13 || Campbell(6–1) || Cornelio(3–3) || — || 5,576 || 25–13 || 10–6 || StatsStory
|- bgcolor="bbffbb"
| April 23 || 5:00 pm || ESPN+ || at No. 3 Oklahoma State || No. 21 || O'Brate StadiumStillwater, OK || W6–4 || Perez(4–1) || Mederos(3–3) || Wright(1) || 7,738 || 26–13 || 11–6 || StatsStory
|- bgcolor="bbffbb"
| April 24 || 12:00 pm || — || at No. 3 Oklahoma State || No. 21 || O'Brate StadiumStillwater, OK || W7–6 || Bolden(4–0) || Morrill(1–1) || Wright(2) || 5,031 || 27–13 || 12–6 || StatsStory
|- bgcolor="#ffbbbb"
| April 26 || 6:00 pm || ESPN+ || Dallas Baptist* || No. 20 || Lupton StadiumFort Worth, TX || L5–6 || Sherlin(2–0) || Ridings(2–2) || Russell(1) || 4,089 || 27–14 || — || StatsStory
|- bgcolor="#ffbbbb"
| April 29 || 6:00 pm || ACCN || at * || No. 20 || Dick Howser StadiumTallahassee, FL || L0–10 || Messick(6–2) || Cornelio(3–4) || — || 4,241 || 27–15 || — || StatsStory
|- bgcolor="#ffbbbb"
| April 30 || 5:00 pm || ACCN || at Florida State* || No. 20 || Dick Howser StadiumTallahassee, FL || L3–7 || Crowell(4–0)  || Savage(1–1) || — || 4,644 || 27–16 || — ||
StatsStory
|-

|- align="center" bgcolor="bbbbbb"
| May 1 || 11:00 am || ACCN || at Florida State* || No. 20 || Dick Howser StadiumTallahassee, FL || colspan="8" | Canceled due to weather conditions 
|- bgcolor="bbffbb"
| May 6 || 6:00 pm || ESPN+ || Oklahoma || No. 24 || Lupton StadiumFort Worth, TX || W9–7 || Brown(3–2) || Bennett(4–3) || Wright(3) || 4,324 || 28–16 || 13–6 || StatsStory
|- bgcolor="#ffbbbb"
| May 7 || 2:00 pm || ESPN+ || Oklahoma || No. 24 || Lupton StadiumFort Worth, TX || L7–11 || Sandlin(4–3) || Perez(4–2) || Martinez(1) || 4,055 || 28–17 || 13–7 || StatsStory
|- bgcolor="#ffbbbb"
| May 8 || 1:00 pm || ESPN+ || Oklahoma || No. 24 || Lupton StadiumFort Worth, TX || L1–5 || Campbell(2–0) || Bolden(4–1) || Michael(7) || 3,948 || 28–18 || 13–8 || StatsStory
|- bgcolor="bbffbb"
| May 10 || 6:00 pm || ESPN+ || Incarnate Word* ||  || Lupton StadiumFort Worth, TX || W11–7(11) || Hill(1–0) || Hayward(1–7) || — || 3,386 || 29–18 || — || StatsStory
|- bgcolor="bbffbb"
| May 13 || 6:00 pm || ESPN+ || at  ||  || Hoglund BallparkLawrence, KS || W15–6 || Brown(4–2) || Hegarty(6–5) || — || 1,013 || 30–18 || 14–8 || StatsStory
|- bgcolor="bbffbb"
| May 14 || 2:00 pm || ESPN+ || at Kansas ||  || Hoglund BallparkLawrence, KS || W30–3 || Perez(5–2) || Larsen(1–8) || — || 1,003 || 31–18 || 15–8 || StatsStory
|- bgcolor="bbffbb"
| May 15 || 1:00 pm || ESPN+ || at Kansas ||  || Hoglund BallparkLawrence, KS || W8–2 || Mihlbauer(2–0) || Vanderhei(5–6) || — || 717 || 32–18 || 16–8 || StatsStory
|- align="center" bgcolor="bbbbbb"
| May 17 || 6:00 pm || ESPN+ || * || No. 24 || Lupton StadiumFort Worth, TX || colspan="8" | Canceled 
|- bgcolor="bbffbb"
| May 19 || 6:00 pm || ESPN+ || * || No. 24 || Lupton StadiumFort Worth, TX || W7–6 || Walker(5–2) || Pilchard(1–2) || Savage(2) || 3,568 || 33–18 || — || StatsStory
|- bgcolor="bbffbb"
| May 20 || 6:00 pm || ESPN+ || Santa Clara* || No. 24 || Lupton StadiumFort Worth, TX || W10–3 || Perez(6–2) || Hales(3–3) || — || 3,748 || 34–18 || — || StatsStory
|- bgcolor="bbffbb"
| May 21 || 2:00 pm || ESPN+ || Santa Clara* || No. 24 || Lupton StadiumFort Worth, TX || W9–1 || Cornelio(4-4) || Feikes(5–6) || — || 3,805 || 35–18 || — || StatsStory

|-style=""
! colspan=2 |Postseason (3–4)
|- valign="top" 
|

|- 
| Legend:       = Win       = Loss       = Canceled      Bold = TCU team member
|-
|"*" indicates a non-conference game."#" represents ranking. All rankings from D1Baseball on the date of the contest."()" represents postseason seeding in the Big 12 Tournament or NCAA Regional, respectively.

Rankings

References

TCU Horned Frogs
TCU Horned Frogs baseball seasons
TCU Horned Frogs baseball
TCU